The Greenville Lions were a minor league baseball team that existed from 1939 to 1941 and from 1946 to 1950. They played in the Alabama–Florida League in 1939, and in the Alabama State League for the rest of their existence. In 1939, they were affiliated with the Chicago White Sox, in 1940 they were affiliated with the Brooklyn Dodgers and from 1948 to 1950 with the Pittsburgh Pirates. They were based in Greenville, Alabama. Their home games were played at Greenville Stadium The team was known as the Greenville Pirates during their final years of existence.

Year-by-year record

References

External links
Baseball Reference

Baseball teams established in 1939
Baseball teams disestablished in 1950
Defunct minor league baseball teams
Brooklyn Dodgers minor league affiliates
Pittsburgh Pirates minor league affiliates
Chicago White Sox minor league affiliates
Professional baseball teams in Alabama
Defunct Alabama State League teams
Defunct Alabama-Florida League teams
1939 establishments in Alabama
1950 disestablishments in Alabama
Greenville, Alabama
Defunct baseball teams in Alabama
Alabama State League teams